Sprundel is a village in the southern Netherlands, in the Rucphen municipality.
In the past it was the main village of the region, with roads to Roosendaal to the west, Breda to the east, Rotterdam to the north and Antwerp to the south.

The village was first mentioned in 1282 as "Hermano filio Nekers de Sprundele". The etymology is unknown. Sprundel developed in the Middle Ages on a stream ridge. The village was abandoned in 1583 when Charles de Gontaut, duc de Biron was plundering the area. It was resettled around 1592.

The St John the Baptist Church was built in 1922. The 16th century tower from the earlier church was retained. The grist mill De Hoop was built in 1840. By 1960, the wind mill was in a very poor condition. It was bought by the municipality in 1972 and extensively repaired between 1976 and 1977. It is frequently in service.

Sprundel was home to 390 people in 1840.

Gallery

References 

Populated places in North Brabant
Rucphen